The Battle of the Kearsarge and the Alabama is an 1864 oil painting by Édouard Manet. The painting commemorates the Battle of Cherbourg of 1864, a naval engagement of the American Civil War between the Union cruiser  and the Confederate raider . Many spectators were able to see the battle from the coast of France and saw the USS Kearsarge sink the CSS Alabama. Not having witnessed the battle himself, Manet relied on press descriptions of the battle to document his work. Within one month of this battle, Manet had already completed this painting and got it on display in the print shop of Alfred Cadart in Paris.

In 1872, Barbey d'Aurevilly stated that the painting was a "magnificent marine painting" and that "the sea ... is more frightening than the battle". It was hung at Alfred Cadart's and was praised by the critic Philippe Burty.

The painting was acquired by the French art collector Marguerite Charpentier in 1878 and is now in the Philadelphia Museum of Art.

Advance notice 
The battle between the Kearsarge and the Alabama received a lot of attention in the French press. Although Manet himself was not present at the battle, he began to paint the event based on newspaper descriptions shortly afterwards. Just 26 days later, he was able to exhibit the work in Alfred Cadart's art gallery on Rue de Richelieu in Paris. At the top of the painting is the Alabama, which is about to sink; beyond, barely visible, the Kearsarge. In the thick clouds of smoke, the loosely painted masts and ropes are only partially visible. On the right is probably the Deerhound. In the foreground, a French ship rushes to the aid of sailors who have clung to a piece of wreckage.

Although they are not among his best-known works, Manet painted a large number of sea and harbor views. Until a few years before his death, they were the only landscapes he made. The journey he undertook as a 16-year-old boy to Brazil and the many holidays on the coast of the Channel probably play a role in this. Striking in all these seascapes is the high horizon, perhaps inspired by Japanese prints. The foaming sea, painted turquoise, blue, and grey, takes up three quarters of the painting.

See also
 The Kearsarge at Boulogne

References

External links
 Jennifer A. Thompson, "The Battle of the USS 'Kearsarge' and the CSS 'Alabama,'" in The John G. Johnson Collection: A History and Selected Works, a Philadelphia Museum of Art free digital scholarly catalogue.
 Juliet Wilson-Bareau with David C. Degener, Manet and the American Civil War: The Battle of the U.S.S. Kearsarge and the C.S.S. Alabama, Issued in connection with an exhibition held June 3 - August 17, 2003, Metropolitan Museum of Art, New York.

Paintings by Édouard Manet
American Civil War in art
1864 paintings
Battle of the Kearsarge and the Alabama
CSS Alabama
Naval war paintings